Harborough District Council elections are generally held every four years. Harborough District Council is the local authority for the non-metropolitan district of Harborough in Leicestershire, England. Since the last boundary changes in 2019, 34 councillors have been elected from 19 wards.

Political control
The first election to the council was held in 1973, initially operating as a shadow authority before coming into its powers on 1 April 1974. Since 1973 political control of the council has been held by the following parties:

Leadership
The leaders of the council since 2000 have been:

Council elections
1973 Harborough District Council election
1976 Harborough District Council election
1979 Harborough District Council election
1983 Harborough District Council election (New ward boundaries)
1987 Harborough District Council election
1991 Harborough District Council election
1995 Harborough District Council election
1999 Harborough District Council election
2003 Harborough District Council election (New ward boundaries)
2007 Harborough District Council election
2011 Harborough District Council election
2015 Harborough District Council election
2019 Harborough District Council election (New ward boundaries)

Election results

A dash indicates that the results for a particular election are not available, or that a party did not stand in an election.

By-election results

1995-1999

1999-2003

2003-2007

2007-2011

2011-2015

2015-2019

2019-2023

References

 By-election results

External links
Harborough District Council

 
Council elections in Leicestershire
Harborough District
District council elections in England